Grünstraße is a station on the Cologne Stadtbahn line 4, located in the Cologne district of Mülheim.

See also 
 List of Cologne KVB stations

External links 
 station info page 
 

Cologne KVB stations
Mülheim, Cologne